Nyarugenge is a sector (umurenge) located in Nyarugenge District, Kigali Province, Rwanda.

Location
It is located in the southwest part of the city of Kigali. The coordinates of Nyarugenge Sector are:1°58'02.0"S, 30°03'20.0"E (Latitude:-1.967222; Longitude:30.055556).

Overview
It is primarily a commercial sector, with plenty of businesses located there. AB Bank Rwanda, a microfinance bank maintains a branch in the sector. In March 2018, Commercial Bank of Africa (Rwanda) established a branch in this area.

Nyarugenge District
Nyarugenge District is divided into 10 sectors (imirenge): Gitega, Kanyinya, Kigali, Kimisagara, Mageragere, Muhima, Nyakabanda, Nyamirambo, Nyarugenge, and Rwezamenyo.

References

External links
  Rwanda: Nyarugenge Youth Advised to Be Innovative

Kigali
Sectors of Rwanda